Várhidi is a Hungarian surname. Notable people with the surname include:

Pál Várhidi (1931–2015), Hungarian footballer and manager
Péter Várhidi (born 1958), Hungarian footballer and manager, son of Pál

See also
Vahidi

Hungarian-language surnames